Ballads & Blues is an album by The Mastersounds led by vibraphonist Buddy Montgomery with pianist Richie Crabtree, bassist Monk Montgomery and drummer Benny Barth featuring performances recorded in early 1959 and released on the World Pacific label.

Reception

The Allmusic review by  Scott Yanow stated "The music is quite accessible, if now difficult to find".

Track listing
 "Blues Medley: Bluesology/Purple Sounds/Fontessa" (Milt Jackson/Dizzy Gillespie/John Lewis) - 6:49
 "Heidi" (Richie Crabtree) - 3:17
 "Little Stevie (Monk Montgomery) - 6:52
 "Solar" (Miles Davis) - 4:05
 "How Deep Is the Ocean?" (Irving Berlin) - 4:27
 "Monk's Ballad" (Monk Montgomery) - 4:01
 "Mint Julep" (Rudy Toombs) - 5:45
 "The Champ" (Gillespie) - 4:01

Personnel
Buddy Montgomery - vibraphone
Richie Crabtree - piano
Monk Montgomery - Fender electric bass
Benny Barth - drums

References
 

Buddy Montgomery albums
Monk Montgomery albums
1959 albums
World Pacific Records albums